Tetractomia tetrandra, synonym Terminthodia viridiflora, is a species of plant in the family Rutaceae. It is endemic to Peninsular Malaysia.

References

 

tetrandra
Endemic flora of Peninsular Malaysia
Conservation dependent plants
Taxonomy articles created by Polbot